Raúl Aguilar Batres (December 1, 1910 – May 13, 1964) was a Guatemalan civil engineer. He is the inventor of the street naming and house numbering conventions that are used in Guatemala City and other cities in Guatemala.

Biography

Aguilar Batres was born December 1, 1910 in Guatemala City. He graduated from the Universidad Nacional in 1939 with a degree in civil engineering. He served as a university professor, as an assistant engineer on the Joint Commission on the boundary with Mexico, and in the Guatemala City Department of Planning. Aguilar Batres devised a system to rename and number the streets of Guatemala City, dividing the city into 25 zones. North-south streets were numbered as Avenidas and east-west streets as Calles. Hyphenated numbers were assigned to addresses to indicate distance in meters from a specified cross street. The system was introduced in 1947 and subsequently adopted by other cities such as Quetzaltenango. Aguilar Batres died May 13, 1964.

Legacy

Calle de Amatitlán in Guatemala was renamed Calzada Raúl Aguilar Batres within a few years of Aguilar Batres' death. A monument, featuring a marble bust sculpted by Rodolfo Galeotti Torres was created in 1970 and placed on Calzada Aguilar Batres in zone 11 of Guatemala City.

See also
 Marco Antonio Cuevas

References

Further reading 
 

People from Guatemala City
Civil engineers
1910 births
1964 deaths
Guatemalan engineers